Khorolsky (masculine), Khorolskaya (feminine), or Khorolskoye (neuter) may refer to:
Khorolsky District, name of several districts in the countries of the former Soviet Union
Khorolsky (rural locality), name of several rural localities in Russia